Nahr-e Owj Albu Seyyed (also Romanized as Nahr-e ‘Owj Albū Şeyyed; also known as Rūstā-ye ‘Owj) is a village in Nasar Rural District, Arvandkenar District, Abadan County, Khuzestan Province, Iran. At the 2006 census, its population was 100, in 24 families.

References 

Populated places in Abadan County